Lleyton Hewitt was the defending champion but did not compete that year.

Roger Federer won in the final 6–3, 6–3 against qualifier Juan Ignacio Chela.

Seeds
A champion seed is indicated in bold text while text in italics indicates the round in which that seed was eliminated.

  Sébastien Grosjean (first round)
  Roger Federer (champion)
  Andy Roddick (semifinals)
  Guillermo Cañas (second round)
  Arnaud Clément (first round)
  Thomas Johansson (first round)
  Carlos Moyá (first round)
  Albert Portas (withdrew due to a forearm injury)

Draw

Qualifying

Qualifying seeds

Qualifiers

Lucky losers
  Jacobo Díaz (replaced Albert Portas)

Special exempts

Qualifying draw

First qualifier

Second qualifier

Third qualifier

Fourth qualifier

References

External links
 2002 Adidas International draw
 2002 Adidas International Singles qualifying draw

Men's Singles
Singles